William Evans Midwinter (19 June 1851 – 3 December 1890) was a cricketer who played four Test matches for England, sandwiched in between eight Tests that he played for Australia. Midwinter holds a unique place in cricket history as the only cricketer to have played for both Australia and England in Test Matches against each other.

Professional career
Midwinter made his Test debut in the first ever Test match in 1877, playing for Australia, where he had emigrated aged nine, against the country of his birth. He took five wickets in the first innings against England in Melbourne.

Billy played in the 2nd test of the 1876–1877 Series. The match started on 31 March 1877. Australia won the toss and elected to bat. Billy played at No: 6. He came out when Australia were 60 for 4 to join debut man Thomas Kelly. Billy batted with all 3 test debutants, Thomas Kelly, Frederick Spofforth and Billy Murdoch. He scored 31, his top score at the time and became the 3rd Test Batsman to score 53 runs in a Test Career.

Later that year he returned to England, playing for WG Grace's Gloucestershire County Cricket Club. He was included in the Australian team to tour England in 1878, and played some matches for them, before, about to take the field at Lord's he was virtually kidnapped by Grace, who took him to the Oval to play for Gloucestershire in their game against Surrey. He didn't return to the tour, instead remaining (voluntarily) with Gloucestershire until the 1882 season.

He was selected to tour with the England team visiting Australia in 1881/2, playing four Tests, and then in 1882/3 Midwinter emigrated back to Australia, joining Victoria. He was selected for Australia to play the one-off Test after England had won the first Ashes series in 1883/4, and then for the Australian tour of England in 1884. This makes him the only man to play Test cricket for one international side, then another, and then return to his original international team.

His batting performance at Test level was not exceptional, but his first-class performances for Victoria and Gloucestershire show he was among the best all-rounders in his era.

By 1889, Midwinter's wife and two of his children had died, and his businesses were failed or failing. He became "hopelessly insane" and was confined to Bendigo Hospital in 1890. He was then transferred to the Kew Asylum, where he died later that year. He was buried in the Melbourne General Cemetery.

See also
List of cricketers who have played for two international teams

References

External links

The Midwinter file, Graham Parker, Wisden 1971
Cricinfo page on Billy Midwinter
Brief profile of W.E. Midwinter by Don Ambrose
List of first-class matches played by Billy Midwinter
Midwinter's midsummer madness by Jenny Thompson, an account of Midwinter's kidnapping by WG Grace
CricketArchive page on Billy Midwinter

1851 births
1890 deaths
Australia Test cricketers
Dual international cricketers
England Test cricketers
English cricketers
Gloucestershire cricketers
Victoria cricketers
Marylebone Cricket Club cricketers
United South of England Eleven cricketers
People from St Briavels
Melbourne Cricket Club cricketers
Australian cricketers
Cricketers who have taken five wickets on Test debut
Players cricketers
Sportspeople from Gloucestershire
North v South cricketers
Burials at Melbourne General Cemetery